The Memorial Stupa, Thimphu, also known as the Thimphu Chorten, is a stupa (Dzongkha chöten, cheten) in Thimphu, Bhutan, located on Doeboom Lam in the southern-central part of the city near the main roundabout and Indian military hospital. The stupa, built in 1974 to honor the third Druk Gyalpo, Jigme Dorji Wangchuck (1928–1972), is a prominent landmark in the city with its golden spires and bells. In 2008, it underwent extensive renovation. It is popularly known as "the most visible religious landmark in Bhutan". It was consecrated by Dudjom Jigdral Yeshe Dorje.

This stupa is unlike others as it does not enshrine human remains. Only the Druk Gyalpo’s photo in a ceremonial dress adorns a hall in the ground floor. When he was alive, Jigme Dorji wanted to build "a chorten to represent the mind of the Buddha".

History
The Memorial Chorten of Thimphu was conceived by Thinley Norbu Rinpoche (1931–2011),according to the Nyingma tradition of Tibetan Buddhism. It was erected in 1974 in memory of Jigme Dorji Wangchuck, 3rd Druk Gyalpo, who had died in 1972. The main patron was the Druk Gyalpo's mother, Phuntsho Choden.

Architecture

The architecture of the chorten has been designed to present it as “one of the most visible religious structures in Thimphu”. The Memorial Chorten, in the heart of the city, is designed is a Tibetan style chorten, also called the Jangchup Chorten, patterned on the design of a classical stupa, with a pyramidal pillar crowned by a crescent moon and sun. The feature that is distinct here is the outward flaring of the rounded part to give the shape of a vase (a pyramidal shape), unlike a dome shape. The chorten depicts larger than life size images of wrathful deities with their female consorts in large numbers, and many in explicit Yab-Yum sexual poses (one count puts the number of such images at 36).

Exterior

The chorten is a large white structure with a golden spire crowning it and a smaller golden spire above the front porch. It is approached through a small garden and a gate decorated with three slate carvings. On the exterior of the gate are representations of the three protective bodhisattvas – Avalokiteśvara (the symbol of compassion), Mañjuśrī (the symbol of knowledge) and Vajrapāṇi, the symbol of power. On the interior are slates engraved with the image of Ngawang Namgyal, Gautama Buddha and Padmasambhava. Large prayer wheels are located to the left. The chorten attracts many elderly Bhutanese on a daily basis who circumambulate the chorten, whirl the large red prayer wheels and pray at the shrine. It has four entrances but only one entrance is open for devotees to visit the shrine.

Interior

The chorten is decorated with richly carved annexes facing the four directions, and contain mandalas, statues and a shrine dedicated to the third king. The ground floor of the chorten is consecrated to the teachings of Vajrakīlaya. It has four shrines, each with different pictures of the king; with the eastern shrine housing a Buddha image. From the ground floor, a staircase leads to two more floors and each floor has four shrines. A centrally placed large wooden carving covers all three levels, behind the shrines; a large number of wooden carvings mostly depict wrathful looking protective deities. The roof of chorten is accessed from the second level and a protective railing covers the terrace on the third floor. The second floor is dedicated to teachings of the Drukpa Lineage of the Kagyu school to subdue eight varieties of evil spirits and the top floor is dedicated to the teachings of Lama Gongdü. Combined, these three floors form the esoteric teachings of the Nyingmapa sect. All of the texts were once hidden by Padmasambhava and were rediscovered by tertöns in the 19th, 12th and 14th centuries respectively. The top floor has paintings depicting various deities of the Nyingma school, and visions which appear in the bardo. Above the top floor there is a gallery, which can be walked around the circumference of the chorten and which has views of the city.

Religious practice and festival
The Chorten, held in great religious fervour, is circumambulated only in a clockwise direction (reciting prayers and whirling the large red prayer wheels), as is the rule for any religious structures in Bhutan. The Monlam Prayer Festival is held here when the Je Khenpo (the religious head of Bhutan) addresses and blesses those who congregate for the occasion.

References

Bibliography
 
 

Buildings and structures in Thimphu
Religious buildings and structures completed in 1974
1974 establishments in Bhutan
Stupas in Bhutan